Leslie Harris (9 October 1920 – 20 May 2007) was a Barbadian cricketer. He played in five first-class match for the Barbados cricket team from 1942 to 1945.

See also
 List of Barbadian representative cricketers

References

External links
 

1920 births
2007 deaths
Barbadian cricketers
Barbados cricketers
People from Saint Michael, Barbados